The 1990–91 Sporting de Gijón season was the 29th season of the club in La Liga, the 15th consecutive after its last promotion.

Overview
After a tough start of season, where Carlos García Cuervo was sacked after twelve rounds, Ciriaco Cano took the helm of the team to end in the fifth position, qualifying to the UEFA Cup for the sixth time in the club's history.

In the Copa del Rey, the club was eliminated in the semifinals by Mallorca.

Squad

Competitions

La Liga

Results by round

League table

Matches

Copa del Rey

Matches

Squad statistics

Appearances and goals

|}

References

External links
Profile at BDFutbol
Official website

Sporting de Gijón seasons
Sporting de Gijon